Pressmart, founded in 2006, is a digital conversion and delivery partner of print publishers including newspapers, magazines, catalogs, prescriptions, periodicals and books. It is headquartered in Hyderabad, India. It covers all digital channels including web, mobile, tablets, E-Readers, RSS and podcast as well.

Pressmart Products
Magazine Publishing - eMagazine Demo
Newspaper Publishing - ePaper Demo
Web Content Management System (CMS) - ePortal Demo

Notes

References
  IBN Live
 Pressmart releases Browser Apps for iPads and Androids. www.eschoolnews.com.
 http://www.business-standard.com/india/news/motorola-pressmart-combine-for-news-on-the-mobile-service/55615/on Business-Standard

Electronic publishing
Mobile content
Information technology consulting firms of India